The NASA Exceptional Engineering Achievement Medal (abbreviated EEAM) was established by NASA in 1981 to recognize unusually significant engineering contributions towards achievement of aeronautical or space exploration goals. This award is given for individual efforts for applications of engineering principles or methods that have resulted in a contribution of fundamental importance in this field or have significantly enhanced understanding of this field or have significantly advanced the state of the practice as demonstrated by an application to aerospace systems.

Recent recipients

2006
2006 award recipients include:

Claude A. Bryant
Keyur C. Patel
Frank J. Vaughn
Walter C. Engelund
Donald R. Pettit
Russell A. Wincheski
John P. McManamen
John W. Slater
Russell A. Paielli
James L. Walker

2007
2007 award recipients include:

James Baughman
Kendall Brown
Steven Fredrickson
Charles Harris
Michael Kirsch
Chia-Yen Peng
Scott Berry
Michael Burms
Lawrence Freudinger
Eastwood Im
Joseph Lavelle
Todd Bonalsky
K. Cramer
Robert Hall
David Iverson
Pappu Murthy
Shannon Bragg-Sitton
John Edwards
Steven Harrah
Steven Jones
Shahana Pagen

2008
2008 award recipients include:

W. Keith Belvin
Charles Camarda
Dennis J. Eichenberg
Stephen F. Harvin
Roger Mattson
Stephen Scotti
John A. Wagner
Thomas F. Zoladz
Jeffrey S. Boyer
Rebecca Castano
Ronald M. Galvez
Dan Jackson
Robert E. McMurray
Stephen Snodgrass
William P. Winfree
John R. Brophy
Brian K. Cooper
Thomas W. Goodnight
William A. Kilgore
Patrick F. Morrissey
Ashitey Trebi-Ollennu
Michael J. Wright
Jay Brusse
Lyle T. Davis
George R. Harpster
David J. Mangus
David J. Pogue
Glenn Rakow
Katherine P. Vanhooser
Pen-Shu Yeh

2009
2009 award recipients include:

Ayman A. Abdallah
Shawn P. Breeding
Prasun N. Desai
Mark G. Femminineo
Lorie R. Grimes-Ledesma
Jonathan E. Jones
Mary J. Li
Daniel L. Polis
Michael J. Schuh
John M. Van Eepoel
Shannon J. Zelinski
Mark A. Balzer
Chad B. Bryant
Theodore R. Drain
Gerard Floyd
Scott Hensley
Dennis L. Kern
Frank S. Milos
John K. Ramsey
Regina L. Spellman
Philip R. Ward
Thomas G. Bialas
James M. Corliss
Michael J. Dube
Dion T. Fralick
Brent W. Jett
Won S. Kim
Bo J. Naasz
Giulio Rosanova
Thomas R. Stevenson
Harold D. Wiedemuth
Richard K. Bird
Michael J. Deliz
Sandra K. Elam
Gani B. Ganapathi
William T. K. Johnson
Raymond J. Lanzi
Allen R. Parker
Dara Sabahi
Oscar Toledo
Thomas C. Williams

2010
2010 award recipients include:

Timothy C. Adams
Steve N. Beck
Ed Cheung
Myron A. Diftler
Thomas Friedmann
Martin B. Houghton
Eugene A. Morelli
Paul W. Roberts
James Taylor
Dennis Albaijes
Daniel L. Berry
D. Steven Cooley
Marcia S. Domack
Daniel B. Gazda
Young K. Kim
David E. Myers
Jose I. Rodriguez
John C. Thesken
Christian C. Bechtold
Kevin R. Boyce
Mark G. D’Agostino
Richard E. Dyke
Michael G. Gilbert
Darlene S. Lee
Janiene Pape
Don J. Roth
Jirong Yu
Robin A. Beck
Scott C. Burleigh
Paul M. Danehy
David F. Everett
Mark W. Hilburger
Joseph C. Lewiz
John C. Pearson
Henry P. Sampler
Daniel E. Yuchnovicz

2011
2011 award recipients include:

Xin An
Jay Brandon
William M. Cirillo
Robert Fong
Charles E. Hall
David G. Johnson
Justin H. Kerr
Jeffrey L. Lindner
Fred G. Martwick
Bijan Nemati
Mark A. Stephen
Nathan C. Wood
Robert J. Black
Stephen T. Bryson
Anthony L. Cook
Bryan Fraser
Richard R. Hofer
Ira Katz
Denney J. Keys
Alok K. Majumdar
Ioannis G. Mikellides
Jeffrey R. Piepmeier
John S. Townsend
Ping Y. Yu
Kristin L. Bourkland
Hon M. Chan
Kimberly B. Demoret
Dan M. Goebel
Megan K. Jaunich
Sotirios Kellas
Todd Klaus
Gregory C. Marr
Kathleen Andreozzi Minear
Mark Schoenenberger
Albert C. Whittlesey
Randy R. Bowman
Steven R. Chesley
Thomas P. Flatley
Karen L. Gundy-Burlet
Wayne A. Jermstad
Daniel P. Kelly
Dzu K. Le
Dr. G. Patrick Martin
Nelson Morales
V. S. Scott
Donna V. Wilson

2012
2012 award recipients include:

Sasan C. Armand
Robert B. Ciotti
Omar A. Haddad
Michael G. Houts
Sean D. McCauliff
Craig R. Pires
Michael S. Woronowicz
Ponnampalam Balakumar
Douglas D. Counter
Douglas Hamilton
Jeffery Kolodziejczak
Donald B. Owens
Sriram Rallabhandi
Michael E. Yettaw
Steven X. Bauer
Brett A. Cruden
James T. Heineck
Jer C. Liou
Grant E. Palmer
Patrick A. Tobbe
James A. Chervenak
Bob Downing
Gerard Holzmann
Duncan MacPherson
Peter A. Parker
David H. Williams

2013
2013 award recipients include:

Phillip A. Allen
Philip C. Calhoun
Samuel B. Fowler
Louise Jandura
Carl Liebe
Benjamin J. Pearson
Edward T. Schairer
Christopher V. Voorhees
Daniel C. Allgood
Benjamin D. Cichy
William J. Glaccum
Roy R. Johnson
David M. O'Dell
Keith Peterson
Peter J. Shirron
Jeffrey S. West
Steven F. Balistreri
Patrick H. Dunlap
Ken Hersey
John T. Kaneshige
Jeb Stuart Orr
Tommaso P. Rivellini
Eric M. Slimko
Todd White
Kevin E. Berry
Rodger E. Farley
Russell W. James
Bradford Kercheval
Hume L. Peabody
Alejandro Miguel San Martin
Shaun R. Thomson
David A. Zoller

2014
2014 award recipients include:

Michael J. Aftosmis
Gajanana C. Birur
Michael G. Burns
William J. Downs
Stephen D. Hunter
Erich F. Klein
Christopher Miller
Robin J. Osborne
John M. Van Eepoel
Gary A. Allen, Jr.
Albion H. Bowers
Nathan J. Burnside
Stuart D. Glazer
Jeffrey M. Jaso
James C. Knox
Marcus S. Murbach
Timothy J. Ray
Douglas N. Wells
Anthony P. Bartolone
Aaron M. Brandis
Andrew J. Cecil
Michael R. Hannan
Ralph Jones
Dmitry G. Luchinsky
Thomas E. Nolan
Donald V. Sullivan
William A. Wood
Mehdi Benna
Nelson A. Brown
Jeffrey Cheezum
David B. Harper
Peter E. Kascak
Pamela A. McVeigh
Salvatore M. Oriti
John M. Tota
Tony Yu

2015
2015 award recipients include:

Cecil W. Acree
Sundareswara Balakrishna
Gregory L. Barnett
Karen L. Bibb
Arthur T. Bradley
Jeffrey S. Brink
Robert J. Bruckner
Donald L. Carter
Benjamin D. Cichy
Eric C. Dimpault-Darcy
Tammy D. Flowers
Ulrik B. Gliese
Michael H. Haddock
Philip J. Hamory
Patricia A. Howell
Thomas P. Jasin
Timothy J. Ray
Robert J. Kenny
Michael P. Kovach
Lisa M. Ling
Forrest E. Lumpkin
Diego F. Pierrottet
David L. Pletcher
Steven Z. Queen
Stuart E. Rogers
Alan M. Schwing
David A. Sheppard
Robert W. Stough
Sean S. Swei
Chun Y. Tang
Paulo F. Uribe
Donald E. Van Drei
Gary K. Won

2016
2016 award recipients include:

Morgan B. Abney
Jeffrey L. Coughlin
Paul S. Kinard
Christopher I. Morris
Mark V. Vaccaro
John W. Van Norman

2017
2017 award recipients include:

Christopher D. Karlgaard
Thomas A. Ozoroski

2018
2018 award recipients:

Jessie L. Christiansen
Theodore J. Garbeff
Cole D. Kazemba
Jayanta Panda
Stefan R. Schuet
Zion W. Young

See also 
 List of NASA awards

References

External links
 NASA awards
 National Aeronautics and Space Administration Honor Awards (1969-1978)

Exceptional Engineering Achievement Medal